The Helen Bernstein Book Award for Excellence in Journalism is an annual literary award for "a journalist whose work has brought public attention to important issues", awarded by the New York Public Library. It was established in 1987 in memory of journalist Helen Bernstein, and there is a cash award of $15,000.

Winners
 1988 – James Reston for fifty years of journalism
 1989 – Judy Woodruff for television reporting of the Iran–Contra affair
 1990 – Thomas Friedman for From Beirut to Jerusalem
 1991 – Nicholas Lemann for The Promised Land: The Great Black Migration and How It Changed America
 1992 – Alex Kotlowitz for There Are No Children Here: The Story of Two Boys Growing Up in the Other America
 1993 – Samuel Freedman for Upon This Rock: The Miracles of a Black Church
 1994 – David Remnick for Lenin's Tomb: The Last Days of the Soviet Empire
 1995 – Joseph Nocera for A Piece of the Action: How the Middle Class Joined the Money Class
 1996 – Tina Rosenberg for The Haunted Land: Facing Europe's Ghosts After Communism
 1997 – David Quammen for The Song of the Dodo: Island Biogeography in an Age of Extinctions
 1998 – Patti Waldmeir for Anatomy of A Miracle: The End of Apartheid and the Birth of the New South Africa
 1999 – Philip Gourevitch for We Wish to Inform You That Tomorrow We Will Be Killed with Our Families: Stories from Rwanda
 2000 Joint winner: – James Mann for About Face: A History of America's Curious Relationship with China, from Nixon to Clinton  
 2000 Joint winner: – Patrick Tyler for A Great Wall: Six Presidents and China: An Investigative History
 2001 – Elaine Sciolino for Persian Mirrors: The Elusive Face of Iran
 2002 – Nina Bernstein for The Lost Children of Wilder: The Epic Struggle to Change Foster Care
 2003 – Keith Bradsher for High and Mighty: SUVs--The World’s Most Dangerous Vehicles and How They Got That Way
 2004 – Dana Priest for The Mission: Waging War and Keeping Peace with America’s Military (W. W. Norton & Company)
 2005 – Jason DeParle for American Dream: Three Women, Ten Kids, and a Nation's Drive to End Welfare (Viking)
 2006 – George Packer for The Assassins' Gate: America in Iraq (Farrar, Straus and Giroux)
 2007 – Lawrence Wright for The Looming Tower: Al-Qaeda and the Road to 9/11 (Alfred A. Knopf)
 2008 – Charlie Savage  for Takeover: The Return of the Imperial Presidency and the Subversion of American Democracy (Little Brown & Company)  
 2009 – Jane Mayer for The Dark Side: The Inside Story of How the War on Terror Turned into a War on American Ideals (Doubleday)  
 2010 – David Finkel for The Good Soldiers (Sarah Crichton Books/Farrar Straus and Giroux) 
 2011 – Shane Harris for The Watchers: The Rise of America's Surveillance State
 2012 – Ellen Schultz for Retirement Heist: How Companies Plunder and Profit from the Nest Eggs of American Workers
 2013 – Katherine Boo for Behind the Beautiful Forevers: Life, Death, and Hope in a Mumbai Undercity
 2014 – Dan Fagin for Toms River: A Story of Science and Salvation
 2015 – Anand Giridharadas for The True American: Murder and Mercy in Texas
 2016 – Jill Leovy for Ghettoside: A True Story of Murder in America
 2017 – Jane Mayer for Dark Money: The Hidden History of the Billionaires Behind the Rise of the Radical Right 
 2018 – Masha Gessen for The Future is History: How Totalitarianism Reclaimed Russia
 2019 – Shane Bauer for American Prison: A Reporter's Undercover Journey into the Business of Punishment
 No Turning Back: Life, Loss, and Hope in Wartime Syria by Rania Abouzeid
 The Poisoned City: Flint's Water and the American Urban Tragedy by Anna Clark
 Amity and Prosperity: One Family and the Fracturing of America by Eliza Griswold
 Dopesick: Dealers, Doctors, and the Drug Company That Addicted America by Beth Macy
 2020 – Rachel Louise Snyder for No Visible Bruises: What We Don’t Know About Domestic Violence Can Kill Us
 She Said: Breaking the Sexual Harassment Story That Helped Ignite a Movement by Jodi Kantor and Megan Twohey
 Charged: The New Movement to Transform American Prosecution and End Mass Incarceration by Emily Bazelon
 A Good Provider Is One Who Leaves: One Family and Migration in the 21st Century by Jason DeParle
 The Outlaw Ocean: Journey’s Across the Last Untamed Frontier by Ian Urbina

 2022 - Andrea Elliott for Invisible Child: Poverty, Survival & Hope in an American City

References

External links
List of past winners 

Awards established in 1987
American non-fiction literary awards
1987 establishments in New York City
New York Public Library